The 1963 Campeonato Brasileiro Série A (officially the 1963 Taça Brasil) was the 5th edition of the Campeonato Brasileiro Série A.

Format 
The competition was a single elimination knockout tournament featuring two-legged ties, with a Tie-Break (play-off) if the sides were tied on points (however, if the tie-break was a draw, the aggregate score of the first two legs was used to determine the winner).

Teams 
20 State Champions qualified for the tournament including, for the first time, the champions of the Federal Distrito and Goiás.

Northern Zone

Northeastern Group

Northern Group

Northern Zone Final

Southern Zone

Southern Group

Central Group

Southern Zone Final

National Semi-Finals
Botafogo and Santos entered in this stage

National Final

References

External links
1963 Taça Brasil

Brazil
1
1963 Taca Brasil
B